The 96th Assembly District of Wisconsin is one of 99 districts in the Wisconsin State Assembly.  Located in western Wisconsin, the district comprises all of Crawford County and nearly all of Vernon County, as well as most of the southern half of Monroe County.  It includes the cities of Prairie du Chien, Viroqua, and Westby, and the villages of Cashton, Chaseburg, Coon Valley, De Soto, Eastman, Ferryville, Gays Mills, Genoa, Kendall, La Farge, Melvina, Mount Sterling, Norwalk, Oakdale, Soldiers Grove, Wauzeka, and Wilton.  It also contains Wildcat Mountain State Park and much of the Fort McCoy U.S. Army installation.  The district is represented by Republican Loren Oldenburg, since January 2019.

The 96th Assembly district is located within Wisconsin's 32nd Senate district, along with the 94th and 95th Assembly districts.

List of past representatives

References 

Wisconsin State Assembly districts
Crawford County, Wisconsin
Monroe County, Wisconsin
Vernon County, Wisconsin